The Diamond Shoals are an infamous, always-shifting cluster of shallow, underwater sandbars that extend  out from Cape Hatteras, North Carolina, United States. Hidden beneath the waves and constantly changing in both form and depth, the shoals are believed to be responsible for up to 600 shipwrecks along the Cape Hatteras shoreline, an area commonly known as the "Graveyard of the Atlantic".

References

Shoals of the United States